The Farne Islands are a group of islands off the coast of Northumberland, England. The group has between 15 and 20 islands depending on the level of the tide. They form an archipelago, divided into the Inner Group and the Outer Group. The main islands in the Inner Group are Inner Farne, Knoxes Reef, the East and West Wideopens (all joined on very low tides), and (somewhat separated) the Megstone; the main islands in the Outer Group are Staple Island, Brownsman, North and South Wamses, Big Harcar, and Longstone. The two groups are separated by Staple Sound.

History

Monks and hermits
The earliest recorded inhabitants of the Farne Islands were various Culdees, some connected with Lindisfarne. This followed the old Celtic Christian tradition of island hermitages, also found in Wales, Ireland, and Scotland.

The islands are first recorded in 651, when they became home to Saint Aidan, followed by Saint Cuthbert. Cuthbert isolated himself on the islands until he was called to the bishopric of Lindisfarne, but after two years, he returned to the solitude of the Inner Farne and died there in 687, when Saint Aethelwold took up residence, instead. Among other acts, Cuthbert introduced special laws in 676 protecting the eider ducks, and other seabirds nesting on the islands; these are thought to be the earliest bird-protection laws anywhere in the world.

The islands were used by hermits intermittently from the seventh century. These included Saint Bartholomew of Farne. The last hermit was Thomas De Melsonby, who died on the islands in 1246.

A formal monastic cell of Benedictine monks was established on the islands circa 1255.  The cell was dependent on Durham Abbey, now Durham Cathedral.  A very small cell, it was usually home to only two monks, although on occasion this rose to as many as six.  The cell was dissolved in 1536 as part of King Henry VIII's Dissolution of the Monasteries.

Following the dissolution of the monastic cell on the islands, they became the property of the Dean and Chapter of Durham Cathedral, who leased them to various tenants.  The islands remained a detached part of County Durham until 1844, when the Counties (Detached Parts) Act transferred them to Northumberland.  In 1861, the islands were  sold to Charles Thorp, who was at the time Archdeacon of Durham.  In 1894, the islands were bought by  industrialist William Armstrong, 1st Baron Armstrong.  The islands are currently owned by the National Trust.

Remains still exist of the seventh-century anchorite cell used by Saint Aidan and Saint Cuthbert, as do the remains of a 14th-century chapel associated with the cell.  Known as St Cuthbert's Chapel, it is described as a "single-cell building of four bays".  The remains of a second chapel have been incorporated into a later building.

Grace Darling
The Farne Islands are associated with the story of Grace Darling and the wreck of the Forfarshire. Grace Darling was the daughter of Longstone lighthouse-keeper (one of the islands' lighthouses), William Darling, and on 7 September 1838, at the age of 22 years,  her father and she rescued nine people from the wreck of the Forfarshire in a strong gale and thick fog, the vessel having run aground on Harcar Rock. The story of the rescue attracted extraordinary attention throughout Britain, and made Grace Darling a heroine who has gone down in British folklore.

Today
The islands have no permanent population, but National Trust rangers live on the islands for most of the year; they live in the old pele tower on the Inner Farne (the largest and closest inshore of the islands), Lighthouse Cottage on Inner Farne and the lighthouse cottage on the Brownsman in the outer group. The pele tower was built around 1494, by or for Thomas Castell, Prior of Durham.

Lighthouses
 The lighthouse would not have been painted red and white in Grace Darling's day.
The first lighthouse was built on the islands in 1773; prior to that, a beacon may have been installed on Prior Castell's Tower, permission having first been given for a light on Inner Farne in 1669.

Currently, two lighthouses are operated by Trinity House on the Farne Islands:
 Farne Lighthouse was built in 1811 and originally named Inner Farne Lighthouse.
 Longstone Lighthouse was built in 1826 and originally named Outer Farne Lighthouse.

Former lighthouses on the islands include:

 Farne Island Lighthouse was built in 1673, but never lit; its replacement was built by Captain John Blackett in 1778, itself replaced by Trinity House with the current Farne Lighthouse in 1811.  A minor light, called the Low Light, was also established by Trinity House on the north west of Farne between 1811 and 1910. to aid navigation by lining this light up with the Inner Farne light
 Staple Island Lighthouse was built by Captain Blackett in 1778 and blown down in the Great Storm of 1784; a replacement, built either in the same place or on Brownsman Island, was knocked down by heavy seas in 1800.
 Brownsman Lighthouse, built in 1800, was replaced by Trinity House with a new tower in 1811 and closed in 1826 when Longstone Lighthouse was established.

All the operational lighthouses on the Farnes are now automatic and have no resident keepers, although in former years, they did. The lighthouse is now maintained by Trinity House via its local lighthouse attendant, George Shiel, who provides guided tours inside the lighthouse. Ruins of some of the older lighthouses may be seen, for example on the Brownsman, which has two. Before the lighthouses, beacons were on several of the islands. The prominent white streak on the cliff facing the mainland (see photo) is similar to bird droppings; although many parts of the islands do exhibit this colouring during the breeding season only, in this case it is the result of chalk deposits from the many years of spent calcium carbide from the lighthouse being thrown down the cliff; this calcium carbide was used to generate acetylene, which was used as fuel for the light before electricity came.

Ecology and natural history
The Farne Islands are an internationally important wildlife habitat. In summer puffins, eider duck, Arctic tern, shag, guillemot, kittiwake, fulmar, razorbill, common tern and Sandwich tern all breed here, while in late autumn a large colony of grey seals pup on the islands. Summer visitors to Inner Farne are strongly advised to wear hats due to Arctic terns dive bombing to protect their chicks.

Breeding birds on the Farnes (as of 2012) include:

 Shelduck – 2 pairs
 Mallard – 17 pairs
 Common eider – 443 pairs
 Fulmar – 276 pairs
 Cormorant – 135 pairs
 Shag – 965 pairs
 Oystercatcher – 39 pairs
 Herring gull – 72 pairs in 2011 (not counted in 2012)
 Lesser black-backed gull – 52 pairs in 2011 (not counted in 2012)
 Ringed plover – 4 pairs
 Black-headed gull – 461 pairs
 Black-legged kittiwake – 4,241 pairs
 Sandwich tern – 966 pairs
 Roseate tern – no pairs, several individuals
 Common tern – 88 pairs
 Arctic tern – 1,180 pairs in 2011 (not counted in 2012)
 Guillemot – 49,076 birds
 Razorbill – 365 pairs
 Puffin – 36,285 pairs
 Barn swallow – 4 pairs
 Pied wagtail – 5 pairs
 Rock pipit – 20 pairs

A total of 290 bird species have been recorded on the Farnes, including in the 1760s, an example of the now extinct great auk.

On 28–29 May 1979, an Aleutian tern, a rare tern from the Aleutian Islands in the North Pacific Ocean, visited the Farnes. It was the first, and still the only, member of its species ever seen anywhere in Europe.

A longer-staying unusual visitor was "Elsie" the lesser crested tern, which visited the Farnes every summer from 1984 to 1997; during that period (paired with a male Sandwich tern) she raised several hybrid chicks and attracted several thousand birders keen to see this species in Britain. Lesser crested terns normally nest on islands off the coast of Libya and migrate to West Africa for the winter; "Elsie" is thought to have taken a wrong turn at the Straits of Gibraltar on spring migration.

This remains one of the longest known distances travelled by any bird.

Geology
The Farnes are resistant igneous dolerite outcrops. These would originally have been connected to the mainland and surrounded by areas of less resistant limestone. Through a combination of erosion of the weaker surrounding rock, and sea level rise following the last ice age, the Farnes were left as islands. Because of the way the rock is fissured, dolerite forms strong columns. This gives the islands their steep, in places vertical cliffs, and the sea around the islands is scattered with stacks up to 66 ft (20 m) high. Many of the small islands are bare rock, but the larger islands have a layer of clay subsoil and peat soil supporting vegetation. The rock strata slope slightly upwards to the south, giving the highest cliffs on the south and some beaches to the north.

One classic view of the Farnes, very popular with photographers, is that from the harbour at Seahouses, but they are closer to the mainland further up the road northwards towards Bamburgh, and excellent views may be seen from here, in the vicinity of the Monks House Rocks, as well as from Bamburgh Castle and beach

Shipwrecks and diving
The Farne Islands are popular with bird watchers, and as scuba diving locations, with a variety of sites suitable for all levels of divers, for the seals and wrecks.

Hundreds of ships have been wrecked on the Farnes over the years, providing plenty for wreck divers to explore. Among them are:

{| class="wikitable sortable collapsible autocollapse"
|-
! Name || Year
|-
| Abessinia|| 1921
|-
| Acantha || 1915
|-
| Adelina || 1862
|-
| Advance || 1891
|-
| Aepos || 1920
|-
| African Prince || 1931
|-
| Aid || 1853
|-
| Alert || 1918
|-
| Alexander || 1845
|-
| Alexander || 1947
|-
| Arab || 1849
|-
| Arbutus || 1890
|-
| Ardincaple || 1833
|-
| Armed Dutch vessel || 1650–1715
|-
| Arms || 1825
|-
| Ascot (HMS) || 1918
|-
| Assuan || 1943
|-
| Athelduke || 1945
|-
| Attwood || 1876
|-
| Auckland Castle || 1918
|-
| Augusta || 1823
|-
| Autumn || 1834
|-
| Baltanglia || 1940
|-
| Bonaventure || 1559
|-
| Bowling || 1939
|-
| Brave of Inverness || 1850
|-
| Breeze || 1852
|-
| Britannia || 1795
|-
| Britannia III || 1875
|-
| Britannia IIII || 1915
|-
| Britannia PSS || 1849
|-
| Byron || 1851
|-
| Cairnduna || 1875
|-
| Calcium || 1876
|-
| Caledonia || 1917
|-
| Caledonia of Montrose || 1802
|-
| Caroline || 1955
|-
| Cherokee || (1818)
|-
| Cheviot || 1853
|-
| Children's Friend || 1993
|-
| Chris Christensen || 1915
|-
| Christa || 1976
|-
| City of Aberdeen || (1816)
|-
| Constance || 1972
|-
| Coryton || 1941
|-
| Countess of Mar || 1847
|-
| Courier || 1875
|-
| Cresswell || 1869
|-
| Cydonia || 1916
|-
| Danio || 2013 (refloat)
|-
| Doore || 1855
|-
| Dublin || 1805
|-
| Dunelm || 1949 (refloat)
|-
| Earne || 1859
|-
| Eclipse  || 1851
|-
| Elizabeth Fawcett || (1846)
|-
| Elliott || 1852
|-
| Emerald || 1865
|-
| Emily Reaich || 1924
|-
| Emma || 1914
|-
| Empire Ford || 1943 (refloat)
|-
| Enterprise || 1876
|-
| Est || 1871
|-
| Euphemia || 1848
|-
| Everene || (1940)
|-
| Excel || 1939 (Refloat)
|-
| Expedit || 1917
|-
| Faith || (1847)
|-
| Falcon || 1851
|-
| Fame || 1833
|-
| Fifeshire || 1852
|-
| Flora || (1882)
|-
| Florence Dombey || 1933
|-
| Florence Nightingale || 1860
|-
| Flower of Ross || 1890
|-
| Forfarshire|| 1838
|-
| Formica || 1894
|-
| Fædreland ||
|-
| French caravels (two) || 1462
|-
| Friends || (1857)
|-
| Friendship || 1795
|-
| G.R. Grey || 1918
|-
| Garent || 1842
|-
| Gebruder || 1916
|-
| Generous Mind || (1809)
|-
| Geir || 1908
|-
| George & Mary || 1823
|-
| Glasgow packet || 1806
|-
| Glen || (1909)
|-
| Glenorm || (1906)
|-
| Glenorca || 1913 (Refloat)
|-
| Good Cheer || 2000
|-
| Gowan || 1917
|-
| Graciana || 1920 (Refloat)
|-
| Grade || 1955 (Refloat)
|-
| Grosvenor || 1935
|-
| Gudveig || 1940
|-
| Gustav Vigeland || 1916
|-
| Gwendoline || 1893
|-
| Harmony || 1857
|-
| Hazard || 1815
|-
| Helen || 1853
|-
| Helmsdale || 1939
|-
| Hero || 1817
|-
| Hetos || 1940
|-
| Hibernia || 1876
|-
| Holmrook || 1892
|-
| Holy Island Coble || 1895
|-
| Holy Island yawl || 1875
|-
| Hope (Smack) || 1819
|-
| Horley || 1922
|-
| Humber Packet || 1812
|-
| Igor || 1918
|-
| Ilala || 1876
|-
| Inatje Baaf || 1894
|-
| Industry || 1774
|-
| Isbul & Margarit  || 1849
|-
| Isabella Fowlie || 1941
|-
| Isorna || 1941
|-
| Ivanhoe || 1857
|-
| Jægersborg || 1916
|-
| Jack Tar || 1854
|-
| James B Graham || 1922
|-
| James Harris || 1881
|-
| Jan Ryswyck || 1924
|-
| Jane and Margaret || 1867
|-
| Janet Johnson || 1853
|-
| Jean and Jessie || 1856
|-
| Jemima || 1851
|-
| Jeremiah || 1806
|-
| Jessie || 1847
|-
| Joan || 1845
|-
| Johns || (1841)
|-
| Johns || (1845)
|-
| John || 1849
|-
| John & Isabella || 1808
|-
| John G. Watson || 1930
|-
| Juno || 1819
|-
| Kestrel || 1917
|-
| Kincardine || 1818
|-
| Kopanes || 1941
|-
| Lady Duff || (1853) (refloat)
|-
| Lady of the Lake || 1866
|-
| Lady Panmure || 1851
|-
| Lady Ross || 1847
|-
| Lancaster || 1854
|-
| Leda || 1886
|-
| Liberty || 1849
|-
| Liddle || 1774
|-
| Lilly Miles || 1899
|-
| Loch Leven || 1902
|-
| Lord Strathmore|| 1917 (refloat)
|-
| Lucerne || 1915 (refloat)
|-
| Luiste Josephine || 1851
|-
| Lunesdale || 1929
|-
| Maggie Lauder || 1804
|-
| Maid of Aln || 1863
|-
| Manchant || 1852
|-
| Manly || 1852
|-
| Martha || 1827
|-
| May || 1894
|-
| Maystone || 1949
|-
| Medora || 1865
|-
| Mermaid || 1823
|-
| Merwede || 1918
|-
| Mistley || 1951
|-
| Monkwearmouth || 1823
|-
| Mormilion Frederick || 1800
|-
| Myrtle (brig) || 1864
|-
| Nellie || 1849
|-
| Neptune || (1819)
|-
| Nisus || 1853
|-
| Ocean Bridge || 1873
|-
| Orca || 1982
|-
| Otago || 1915
|-
| Otto M'Combie || 1895
|-
| Paciline Defecamp || 1850
|-
| Pallas || 1901
|-
| Paragon || 1821
|-
| Paragon || 1842
|-
| Paragon || 1895
|-
| Patia || 1941
|-
| Peace and Plenty || 1860
|-
| Pearle || 1740
|-
| Peggy || 1774
|-
| Plough || 1850
|-
| Pluto || 1940
|-
| Prosperous || 1854
|-
| Queenstown || 1916
|-
| Rececca || 1899
|-
| Resolute || 1886
|-
| River Leven || 1953
|-
| Ryoll of Stockton || 1801
|-
| Saint Evelyn Joyce || 1922
|-
| Saint Louis || 1924 (refloat)
|-
| San Bernado || 1916
|-
| Sarah || 1815
|-
| Scottish Prince || 1913
|-
| Sedulous 2 || 1975
|-
| Shadwan || 1888
|-
| Sisters || 1832
|-
| Skovdal || 1917
|-
| Sloop no. 28 || (1806)
|-
| Snowdonia || 1881
|-
| Somali || 1941
|-
| Sootica || 1985
|-
| Smilax || (1851)
|-
| Sphynx || 1919
|-
| Spica || 1916
|-
| St Abbs Head || 1949
|-
| St Andre || 1908
|-
| St Fergus || 1885
|-
| St. Salvator || 1472
|-
| Stamfordham || 1916
|-
| Storfors || 1940
|-
| Strive || 1856
|-
| Success || 1774
|-
| Success || 1853
|-
| Thistle || 1883
|-
| Thomas || 1837
|-
| Thomas Jackson || 1825
|-
| Tioga || 1943
|-
| Tredegar Hall || 1916 (refloat)
|-
| Trio || 1860
|-
| Two Brothers || 1841
|-
| U-1274  || 1945
|-
| Urdate || 1823
|-
| Vaagan || 1916
|-
| Valhal || 1890
|-
| Volunteer || 1846 (refloat)
|-
| Waren Packet || 1830
|-
| Werner Kunstmann || 1914
|-
| William Thorpe || 1852
|-
| William (schooner) || 1864
|-
| Yagen || 1916
|-
| Yewglen || 1960
|}

Dive sites and wrecks
 St Andre was a  French steamship carrying pig iron. On 28 October 1908, she hit the Crumstone and floated off to sink finally at Staple Island.

Diving at the Farnes is generally possible, regardless of wind direction; shelter is always available somewhere. Some dive locations even provide the opportunity to combine diving and birdwatching, in particular the Pinnacles, where guillemots can be found fishing at safety-stop depth.

Civil parish 
Farne Islands was a civil parish, in 1951 the parish had a population of 3. On 1 April 1955 the parish was abolished and merged with North Sunderland.

References

External links

 Farne Islands information at the National Trust
 Farne Islands access and information (commercial)
 John Whiterig, Benedictine Hermit on Farne
 Northumberland Coast — Area of Outstanding Natural Beauty (AONB) — Northumberland Coast AONB Site
 Lighthouse access & boat trips
 Diving around the Farne Islands

National nature reserves in England
National Trust properties in Northumberland
Sites of Special Scientific Interest in Northumberland
Uninhabited islands of Northumberland
Underwater diving sites in England
Nature reserves in Northumberland
Former civil parishes in Northumberland